Kodayanallur Vadamamalachery Soundararajan (born 17 February 1925) is an Indian archaeologist who served as Superintendent of the Chennai circle and later, a Joint Director General of the Archaeological Survey of India. He was known for his pioneering work in excavating Stone Age and megalithic sites of South India along with Mortimer Wheeler and V. D. Krishnaswami in the late 1940s and the 1950s. Some of the sites excavated by Soundararajan include Sanur (near Chengalpattu) (1950), Kundrathur (1955–56), Perur (1970–71), Malayamputtu (1970–71) and Poompuhar (1970–71, 1973–74).

Soundararajan is known for excavating the submerged city of Puhar in the 1970s. In 1990, he controversially remarked about the presence of an 11th-century AD Hindu shrine underneath the remains of Babri Masjid in Ayodhya.

Works 
 Papers
 
 
 
 
 
 
 
 Books
 
 
 
 
 

1925 births
20th-century Indian archaeologists
Living people
Directors General of the Archaeological Survey of India
Scientists from Chennai
Indian social sciences writers
Indian scientific authors
Indian popular science writers